Nick Olesen (born 14 November 1995) is a Danish professional ice hockey player for Brynäs IF in the Swedish Hockey League (SHL) and the Danish men's national team.

He represented Denmark at the 2019 IIHF World Championship.

Career statistics

Regular season and playoffs

International

References

External links

1995 births
Living people
Brynäs IF players
Danish expatriate ice hockey people
Danish expatriate sportspeople in Austria
Danish expatriate sportspeople in Sweden
Danish ice hockey forwards
Frederikshavn White Hawks players
Malmö Redhawks players
Odense Bulldogs players
IK Oskarshamn players
Ice hockey players at the 2022 Winter Olympics
Olympic ice hockey players of Denmark
People from Frederikshavn
Sportspeople from the North Jutland Region